Burgess Brook is a tributary of North Branch Mehoopany Creek in Wyoming County, Pennsylvania, in the United States. The stream is narrow, with a high gradient, and is located in a remote area, mostly far away from any roads. It is designated as Class A Wild Trout Waters and has a large population of brook trout, as well as smaller numbers of brown trout. Three other fish species are also present in the stream.

Course
Burgess Brook begins in a valley on the northern side of Bartlett Mountain in North Branch Township. The stream flows northeast for a few tenths of a mile before turning north-northeast for several tenths of a mile. It then flows north for several tenths of a mile, leaving the valley at the base of Bartlett Mountain before reaching its confluence with North Branch Mehoopany Creek.

Hydrology, geography and geology

Burgess Brook is a high-gradient stream that flows in a generally northerly direction.

The alkalinity at the mouth of Burgess Brook was measured in an August 2001 study to be , while the pH was 6.4.

Watershed
The stream is entirely within the United States Geological Survey quadrangle of Jenningsville. It joins North Branch Mehoopany Creek at Lovelton.

The source of Burgess Brook is in a remote area near the border of Pennsylvania State Game Lands Number 57. The area has been described as "a remote, natural and unspoiled environment". In 2000, the population density of the watershed was 3 people per square kilometer (8 per square mile), putting it in a multi-way tie for the least densely populated sub-watershed of North Branch Mehoopany Creek. While the headwaters are largely forested, agricultural land does occur near the lower reaches of the stream.

No part of Burgess Brook is within  of a road. Only 9 percent of its length is within  of a road, and only 22 percent is within  of one. A total of 30 percent of the length of Burgess Brook is on public land.

History and recreation
Burgess Brook was entered into the Geographic Names Information System on August 2, 1979. Its identifier in the Geographic Names Information System is 1170709.

In 2001, a Pennsylvania Fish and Boat Commission study suggested that Burgess Brook should be designated as Class A Wild Trout Waters. A representative of the Mehoopany Creek Watershed Association made a proposal in 2016 to re-designate Burgess Brook as a High-Quality Coldwater Fishery and Migratory Fishery.

Burgess Brook was noted in 2001 to be a poor site for angling.

Biology
Wild trout naturally reproduce in Burgess Brook from its headwaters downstream to its mouth. It was added to the Pennsylvania Fish and Boat Commission's list of wild trout streams in 2013.

In a 2001 study by the Pennsylvania Fish and Boat Commission, five fish species were observed at the mouth of Burgess Brook, including wild brook trout and brown trout. Other fish species found in the stream include blacknose dace, longnose dace, and creek chub.

Burgess Brook is classified as a Coldwater Fishery. Despite this being its designated use, its existing use is High-Quality Coldwater Fishery. The stream is also designated as Class A Wild Trout Waters for brook trout from its headwaters downstream to its mouth.

See also
Douglas Hollow, next tributary of North Branch Mehoopany Creek going downstream
Miller Brook (North Branch Mehoopany Creek), next tributary of North Branch Mehoopany Creek going upstream
List of rivers of Pennsylvania

References

Tributaries of North Branch Mehoopany Creek